The Venetian Convention and Expo Center (formerly the Sands Expo) is a convention center located in Paradise, Nevada, near the Las Vegas Strip. The Venetian Expo is owned by Vici Properties and operated by Apollo Global Management, and is frequently used for conventions booked at the company's adjoining Venetian and Palazzo resorts. It is also used as overflow space for conventions that outgrow the Las Vegas Convention Center. The Venetian Expo opened in 1990 behind the Sands Hotel, which was later replaced by the Venetian.

History
In 1989, the Sands Hotel received county approval for a convention center with approximately 1.1-million-square-foot, rivaling the Las Vegas Convention Center. The Sands Expo and Convention Center was completed in 1990. At its launch, it was the only privately owned and operated convention center in the United States, and was the second largest convention center in the world.

In 2008, an expansion for the Sands Expo Center was announced. The first part would add another story to the existing building and build a new two-million square foot expo center, built on the Sands-owned land east of the Wynn Las Vegas employee parking garage. A long pedestrian bridge would be built between the two expo centers. Also, half of the existing building would be covered by a new condo tower and hotel, adding to the already large complex, which also includes The Venetian and Palazzo. Ultimately, the expansion and towers would never go forward, 

There has been a new plan floated in May 2015 and November 2018, to build a fill-in station for the Las Vegas Monorail, which will also serve the MSG Sphere at The Venetian.

In 2020, the 12th season of Shark Tank was filmed at the convention center. In 2021, Las Vegas Sands announced that it would sell the convention center to Vici Properties and Apollo Global Management.

References

External links
 Official website

Convention centers in the Las Vegas Valley
Buildings and structures in Paradise, Nevada
Event venues established in 1990
1990 establishments in Nevada